The 2021 French Figure Skating Championships were held in Vaujany from 5 to 6 February 2021. Medals were awarded in the disciplines of men's singles, ladies' singles, and ice dance. The results were part of the French selection criteria for the 2021 World Championships.

Impact of the COVID-19 pandemic 
The French Championships were originally scheduled for 17 to 20 December 2020 in Vaujany, alongside the Christmas Gala on 22 December. On 10 November, Fédération Française des Sports de Glace (FFSG) president Nathalie Péchalat expressed in an interview that she hoped to hold the event, despite the ongoing health crisis. One week later, on 16 November, the FFSG announced the cancellation of both the senior Championships and the Christmas Gala. The FFSG had already cancelled its Grand Prix event, the 2020 Internationaux de France, earlier in the season.

Prior to the cancellation announcement, reigning ice dance champions Gabriella Papadakis / Guillaume Cizeron had already announced that they would be skipping the event. The couple explained their desire to focus on the 2021 World Championship (which they later decided to also skip) and concerns about being stranded in Europe or separated, due to Papadakis having a different visa for their Canadian training base from Cizeron that made it more difficult for her to travel internationally.

On 12 January 2021, the FFSG announced the reinstatement of the French Championships after rescheduling the event to 5–6 February, still to be hosted in Vaujany.

Medal summary

Senior

Junior

Entries 
The Fédération Française des Sports de Glace released a provisional entry list on 27 January 2021. Names with an asterisk (*) denote guest skaters.

Skaters qualified via the Master's de Patinage or selection for a Grand Prix event. Several top skaters, including reigning champions Maé-Bérénice Méité and Papadakis/Cizeron, opted to skip the event.

Results

Men

Ladies

Pairs

Ice dance

Junior Championships 
The French Junior Championships were originally scheduled to be held on 5 to 7 February 2021 in Belfort, before being rescheduled to 3 to 4 April in Villard-de-Lans. Only an ice dance competition was held.

Entries

Results

Junior ice dance

International team selections

World Championships 
The 2021 World Championships will be held in Stockholm, Sweden from 22 to 28 March 2021. FFSG named the team on 1 March 2021.

European Championships 
The 2021 European Championships, scheduled to be held in Zagreb, Croatia from 25 to 31 January 2021, were cancelled on 10 December 2020.

World Junior Championships 
Commonly referred to as "Junior Worlds", the 2021 World Junior Championships, scheduled to take place in Harbin, China from 1 to 7 March 2021, were cancelled on 24 November 2020.

References

External links 
 Results
 Results (junior)
 Events at the Fédération Française des Sports de Glace

French Figure Skating Championships
Figure Skating Championships, 2021
French Figure Skating
French Figure Skating